Miangaran-e Olya (also Romanized as Mīāngarān-e ‘Olyā, Mīān Garān-e ‘Olyā, and Meyāngarān ‘Olyā; also known as Mīāngarān-e Bālā) is a village in Howmeh-ye Gharbi Rural District, in the Central District of Izeh County, Khuzestan Province, Iran. At the 2006 census, its population was 588, in 107 families.

References 

Populated places in Izeh County